RFA Hebe (A406) was a stores ship of the Royal Fleet Auxiliary (RFA). Hebe was built by Henry Robb of Leith for the British-India Steam Navigation Company and was bare-boat chartered to the RFA in 1962.

Hebe was severely damaged by a fire while at Gibraltar on 30 November 1978. The charter was cancelled and the ship returned to her owners. Hebe  was renamed Good Guardian in June 1979, and sailed from Gibraltar on 13 June 1979 for repairs in Greece. She was renamed Guardian in 1981, and Wafa in 1987. The ship arrived at Famagusta for demolition on 16 September 1987.

References

Ships of the Royal Fleet Auxiliary
1962 ships